Rishi denotes an inspired poet of Vedic hymns.

Rishi may also refer to:

Hinduism
 Rishi Panchami, day of worship
 Rishi Bhrigu or Maharishi Bhirgu, one of the seven great sages
 Rishi Jahnu, appears in the story of Ganga and Bhagiratha
 Rishi Marichi or Marichi, the son of Brahma, the cosmic creator
 Rishi Yamdagni or Jamadagni, one of the Saptarishis
 Rishi Durvasa or Durvasa is an ancient sage, son of Atri and Anasuya

People
 Rishi (given name)
 Rishi Sunak, current prime minister of the United Kingdom
 Rishi (surname)
 Rishi (Kannada actor), Indian film actor who works in Kannada cinema
 Rishi (Tamil actor), Tamil film actor

Places
 Rishi Ganga, a river, springing from the Rishi Glacier in Uttarakhand, India
 Rishi Pahar, a Himalayan mountain peak in Uttarakhand, India
 Rishi, Iran, a village

Facilities and structures
 Rishi Valley School, a boarding school in India

Fictional locations
 Rishi (Star Wars), a fictional planet in the Star Wars franchise

Film
 Rishi (2001 film), a 2001 Indian Tamil film
 Rishi (2005 film), a 2005 Indian Kannada film

Other uses
 Rishi coffin, an Egyptian type of coffins, covered with feathers

See also